Nadia Ileana Bogorin (Constantinescu) (born 18 June 1940) is the wife of the 3rd President of Romania Emil Constantinescu. She was the First Lady of Romania from 29 November 1996 to 20 December 2000.

References

External links
http://www.primatv.ro/stiri-focus/de-la-muncitor-necalificat-si-receptionera-la-statutul-de-prima-doamna-afla-in-ce-domenii-au-activat-sotiile.html

Living people
First Ladies of Romania
Romanian women lawyers
University of Bucharest alumni
1940 births